An isolation transformer is a transformer used to transfer electrical power from a source of alternating current (AC) power to some equipment or device while isolating the powered device from the power source, usually for safety reasons or to reduce transients and harmonics. Isolation transformers provide galvanic isolation; no conductive path is present between source and load. This isolation is used to protect against electric shock, to suppress electrical noise in sensitive devices, or to transfer power between two circuits which must not be connected. A transformer sold for isolation is often built with special insulation between primary and secondary, and is specified to withstand a high voltage between windings.
 
Isolation transformers block transmission of the DC component in signals from one circuit to the other, but allow AC components in signals to pass.  Transformers that have a ratio of 1 to 1 between the primary and secondary windings are often used to protect secondary circuits and individuals from electrical shocks between energized conductors and earth ground. 
Suitably designed isolation transformers block interference caused by ground loops. Isolation transformers with electrostatic shields are used for power supplies for sensitive equipment such as computers, medical devices,  or laboratory instruments.

Some specifications require that Isolation transformers be a part of the lightning protection on the AC circuits.

Terminology
Sometimes the term is used to emphasize that a device is not an autotransformer whose primary and secondary circuits are connected. Power transformers with specified insulation between primary and secondary are not usually described only as "isolation transformers" unless this is their primary function. Only transformers whose primary purpose is to isolate circuits are routinely described as isolation transformers.

Operation
Isolation transformers are designed with attention to capacitive coupling between the two windings.  The capacitance between primary and secondary windings would also couple AC current from the primary to the secondary. A grounded Faraday shield between the primary and the secondary greatly reduces the coupling of common-mode noise. This may be another winding or a metal strip surrounding a winding. 
Differential noise can magnetically couple from the primary to the secondary of an isolation transformer, and must be filtered out if a problem occurs.

Applications

Pulse transformers

Some small transformers are used for isolation in pulse circuits.

Electronics testing
In electronics testing and servicing, an isolation transformer is a 1:1 (under load) power transformer used for safety.  Without it, exposed live metal in a device under test is at a hazardous voltage relative to grounded objects such as a heating radiator or oscilloscope ground lead (a particular hazard with some old vacuum-tube equipment with live chassis). With the transformer, as there is no conductive connection between transformer secondary and primary, only a small leakage current will flow if the exposed live metal is connected to earth.

Electrical isolation is considered to be particularly important on medical equipment, and special standards apply. Often the system must additionally be designed so that fault conditions do not interrupt power, but generate a warning.

Supply of equipment at elevated potentials
Isolation transformers are also used for the power supply of devices not at ground potential. An example is the Austin transformer for the power supply of air-traffic obstacle warning lamps on radio antenna masts. Without the isolation transformer, the lighting circuits on the mast would conduct radio-frequency energy to ground through the power supply.

See also
Balun
Power quality
Transformer types
Zigzag transformer

References

External links
 Transformer Isolation

Electric transformers
Electric power conversion
Electrical safety